Central Coast Council is a local government body in Tasmania, situated in the north-west of the state between Burnie and Devonport. Central Coast is classified as an urban local government area and has a population of 21,904, Ulverstone and Penguin are the two primary towns of the region.

History and attributes
The Central Coast Council was established on 2 April 1993 after the amalgamation of the Penguin and Ulverstone municipalities.

Central Coast is classified as urban, regional and small (URS) under the Australian Classification of Local Governments.

The municipal boundaries are the Blythe River in the west, Braddons Lookout Road in the east and Black Bluff in the south. The Central Coast includes the tourist destinations Leven Canyon and Black Bluff, as well as a number of rural areas such as Upper Castra.

Government

Localities

Not in above list
 Middlesex

See also
List of local government areas of Tasmania

References

External links

Central Coast Council official website
Local Government Association Tasmania
Tasmanian Electoral Commission - local government

Local government areas of Tasmania
North West Tasmania